Litoria pratti, commonly known as Pratt's tree frog, is a species of frog in the subfamily Pelodryadinae. It is endemic to the Vogelkopf Peninsula, West Papua, Indonesia, where the type series was collected. There are no confirmed records of this species after it was first recorded, so very little information exists on it.

Litoria pratti is named after Antwerp Edgar Pratt, an explorer who collected the type series.

References

Litoria
Endemic fauna of Indonesia
Amphibians of Western New Guinea
Amphibians described in 1911
Taxonomy articles created by Polbot